Lithoxus surinamensis is a species of armored catfish endemic to Suriname where it is found in stony rivulets of the Gran Rio basin.  This species grows to a length of  SL.

References
 

Ancistrini
Fish of Suriname
Endemic fauna of Suriname
Fish described in 1982